The D-Day Story (formerly the D-Day Museum) is a visitor attraction located in Southsea, Portsmouth in Hampshire, England. It tells the story of Operation Overlord during the Normandy D-Day landings. Originally opened as the D-Day Museum in 1984 by Queen Elizabeth The Queen Mother, it reopened as the D-Day Story, following a refurbishment funded by a £5 million Heritage Lottery grant, in March 2018. The museum building was designed by the then city architect Ken Norrish.

Contents

The story is told in three parts: Preparation; D-Day and the Battle of Normandy; Legacy and the Overlord Embroidery.

The Legacy gallery features the Overlord Embroidery, commissioned by Lord Dulverton to remember those who took part in D-Day and the Battle of Normandy. It consists of 34 different panels. Film clips of veterans talking about their experiences give visitors further insight into what took place.

Other major exhibits include a Sherman tank and a Churchill tank, both displayed on the tank deck of the newly restored LCT 7074, the last surviving D-Day landing craft. Other vehicles in the collection are a Sherman BARV and a DUKW amphibious vehicle. In addition there is a replica infantry landing craft as part of an audio-visual display. There are reconstructions of the operations room at Southwick House, a 1940s sitting room and an Anderson shelter.

The museum is run by Portsmouth Museum Services, a branch of Portsmouth City Council, and is supported by the Portsmouth D-Day Museum Trust, a registered charity.

Refurbishment 
The museum closed in March 2017 for one year to undergo a £5 million refurbishment and allow for conservation work on exhibits. New exhibits include the "pencil that started the invasion" – the pencil used by Lt. Cdr. John Harmer to sign the order for Force G, the naval forces assigned to Gold Beach, to sail to Normandy.

See also
 LCT 7074

References

External links

 
 Visit Portsmouth - The D-Day Story

Military and war museums in England
Museums in Portsmouth
Operation Overlord museums in the United Kingdom
Museums established in 1984
1984 establishments in the United Kingdom